Dictyotrypeta syssema is a species of tephritid or fruit flies in the genus Dictyotrypeta of the family Tephritidae.

Distribution
Costa Rica, Colombia, Ecuador, Peru.

References

Tephritinae
Insects described in 1914
Diptera of South America